Erik Tobias Karlsson, (born 15 May 1977) is a Swedish competitive dancer and  choreographer. Karlsson has been dancing since the age of eight, and has been a professional dancer and choreographer mainly in ballroom dancing since 1999. He has participated in several seasons of the TV4 celebrity dance show Let's Dance, he won the third season of the show dancing with Tina Nordström. He has also danced along with Arja Saijonmaa, Anna Sahlin, Elisabet Höglund, Agneta Sjödin Tina Thörner, Camilla Henemark  and latest in 2013 along with Anette Norberg. He has all in all participated in fourteen seasons of the celebrity dance show both in Sweden and the Danish version  Vild med dans where he has danced with  Sofie Stougaard, Zindy Laursen och Tina Lund. He has also danced in the Norwegian version Skal vi danse along with celebrities Triana Iglesiasa and Cecilie Skog.

In 2008, Karlsson participated in the dance show So You Think You Can Dance Scandinavia which was broadcast on Kanal5, he has also participated in Fort Boyard both in the Swedish and Danish version in 2010 and 2013. He also worked as a judge on the show Talang Sverige 2014 which was broadcast on TV3.

References

External links

Living people
1977 births
Swedish male dancers
Swedish ballroom dancers
Let's Dance (Swedish TV series)
So You Think You Can Dance contestants
21st-century Swedish dancers